Manuel Pinto may refer to:

Manuel Guillermo Pinto (1783-1853), Argentine general and lawmaker
Manuel Vieira Pinto (1923–2020), Portuguese-born Prelate of the Catholic Church in Mozambique
Manuel Pinto da Costa (born 1937), Santoméan politician who served as President
Manuel Pinto (footballer) (born 1938), Portuguese footballer
Manuel Pinto (Scouting) (1938-2008), Ugandan Chief Scout